James Robertson (1813–1888) was an English gem and coin engraver who worked in the Mediterranean region, and who became a pioneering photographer working in the Crimea and possibly India. He is noted for his Orientalist photographs and for being one of the first war photographers.

Life and career
 
Robertson was born in Middlesex in 1813. He trained as an engraver under Wyon (probably William Wyon). In 1841, he settled in Constantinople where he worked as an "engraver and die-stamper" at the Imperial Ottoman Mint. During this period, he appears to have become interested in photography.

By the 1850s, tourist travel to the Near East created strong demand for photographs as souvenirs. A small group of early photographers, mostly of French origin, made their way to Egypt and Constantinople to capitalise on this demand. These pioneering photographers included Félix Bonfils (1831-1885); Gustave Le Gray (1820-1884), brothers Henri and Emile Bechard; the British-Italian brothers, Antonio Beato (c. 1832–1906) and Felice Beato (1832–1909), and the Greek Zangaki brothers. Many of these photographers were in Egypt at the same time, and some, including Robertson, formed partnerships.

In 1853 Robertson began photographing with the British-Italian photographer Felice Beato and the two formed a partnership called Robertson & Beato either in that year or in 1854 when Robertson opened a photographic studio in Pera, Constantinople. Robertson and Beato were joined by Beato's brother, Antonio on photographic expeditions to Malta in 1854 or 1856 and to Greece and Jerusalem in 1857. A number of the firm's photographs produced in the 1850s are signed Robertson, Beato and Co. and it is believed that "and Co." refers to Antonio.

In late 1854 or early 1855 Robertson married the Beato brothers' sister, Leonilda Maria Matilda Beato. The couple had three daughters, Catherine Grace (born in 1856), Edith Marcon Vergence (born in 1859) and Helen Beatruc (born in 1861).

In 1855 Robertson along with Felice Beato, Charles Langlois and Karl Baptiste van Szatmari travelled to Balaklava, Crimea where they photographed the closing stages of the Crimean War. (They had replaced the previous photographer, Roger Fenton.) They photographed the fall of Sevastopol in September 1855. Of all the photographs produced, at least 60 made by Robertson are the best known. It was Robertson's work in Crimea that would earn him the reputation as the world's "first war photographer."

In around 1857 both Robertson and Felice Beato went to Calcutta in India to photograph the aftermath of the Indian Rebellion. Robertson also produced photographs in Palestine, Syria, Malta, and Cairo with either or both of the Beato brothers.

In the late 1850s, Robertson produced a number of water-colours with popular Orientalist themes such as carpet-sellers and snake charmers. It is unclear whether he painted these, or overpainted photographs with a soft, water-colour wash.

In 1860, after Felice Beato left for China to photograph the Second Opium War and Antonio Beato went to Egypt, Robertson briefly teamed up with Charles Shepherd back in Constantinople. The firm of Robertson & Beato was dissolved in 1867, having produced images - including remarkable multiple-print panoramas - of Malta, Greece, Turkey, Damascus, Jerusalem, Egypt, the Crimea and India. Robertson possibly gave up photography in the 1860s; he returned to work as an engraver at the Imperial Ottoman Mint until his retirement in 1881. In that year he left for Yokohama, Japan, arriving in January 1882. He died there in April 1888.

Gallery
Selected Orientalist photographs

Selected war photographs

Selected photographs by Robertson and Beato

See also
 History of photography
 List of Orientalist artists
 Orientalism

References

Further reading
 Clark, John. Japanese Exchanges in Art, 1850s to 1930s with Britain, continental Europe, and the USA: Papers and Research Materials (Sydney: Power Publications, 2001), pp. 89–91, 113.
 Harris, David. Of Battle and Beauty: Felice Beato's Photographs of China (Santa Barbara: Santa Barbara Museum of Art, 1999).
 James Robertson: Photographer of Istanbul, London: The British Council, n.d.
 Oztuncay, Bahattin. James Robertson: Pioneer of Photography in the Ottoman Empire, Istanbul, Eran, 1992
 Union List of Artist Names, s.v. "Robertson, James". Accessed 3 April 2006.

External links 

 Donnelly, Peter, curator. The King's Own Royal Regiment Museum (Lancaster); Photo Gallery, Crimean War 1854-1856. Accessed 7 November 2007.
 The Hurriyet Daily News.
 Commemorating a photographer in Istanbul

1813 births
1888 deaths
People from Middlesex
War photographers
Photographers from the Ottoman Empire
English photojournalists
Engraved gem artists
Orientalist painters
Photography in Egypt
Photography in Greece
Photography in Turkey
Photography in Ukraine
Pioneers of photography
British people of the Crimean War
19th-century British journalists
English male journalists
Early photographers in Palestine
British emigrants to the Ottoman Empire